Hen Church is a parish church of the Church of Norway in Rauma Municipality in Møre og Romsdal county, Norway. It is the church for the Hen parish which is part of the Indre Romsdal prosti (deanery) in the Diocese of Møre. The white, stone church was built in a long church design in 1831 using plans drawn up by an unknown architect. The church seats about 200 people.

History
There has been a church in this village for centuries. There are some artifacts from the church dating back to the 13th century that are now at the Romsdal Museum and the oldest existing written records of the church date back to 1589. Over the years, a number of repairs were carried out on the church, most of them due to rot damage. In 1739, a timber-framed sacristy was added on the north side of the choir.

Starting in 1830, work on a new rectangular stone church constructed out of granite was carried out. This new, white stone church has an onion dome on top of a central tower on the roof. Much of the construction was completed by 1831, but the new building was not formally consecrated until 21 October 1835. After the new building was completed, the old wooden church was torn down. The building is a neo-Romanesque stone long church that has been covered in white plaster on the exterior. The altarpiece was newly built for the new church in 1831. In 1902, the church was expanded with the addition of a new church porch and sacristy. In 1931, the church interior was restored, including a new pulpit. In 1959–1960, the sacristy was expanded and the church porch was rebuilt.

Media gallery

See also
List of churches in Møre

References

Rauma, Norway
Churches in Møre og Romsdal
Stone churches in Norway
Long churches in Norway
19th-century Church of Norway church buildings
Churches completed in 1831
13th-century establishments in Norway